Jiří Pelikán (born 9 May 1970) is a Czech former professional tennis player.

Born in Ostrava, Pelikán competed on the professional tour in the 1990s, reaching a best singles ranking of 208 in the world. He was a semi-finalist at the Poznan Challenger in 1992 and featured in the qualifying draw of the 1995 Wimbledon Championships. His only ATP Tour main draw appearance came in doubles, at the 1994 Czech Indoor.

Pelikán coaches at the TJ Start Ostrava tennis club.

References

External links
 
 

1970 births
Living people
Czech male tennis players
Sportspeople from Ostrava